Taehoon Oh is a computer graphic specialist, game designer and developer. He is a co-founder and COO at Studio Roqovan, formerly known as Reload Studios. He was a lead artist and was one of the pioneer developers of the Call of Duty game franchise. He is also one of the co-founders of the non-gaming virtual reality subdivision of Studio Roqovan called Rascali, launched in September 2015.

Career 
Oh is the owner of Stunt Corgi & serves as chief operating officer at Reload Studios, which he founded in 2014 with James Chung and later renamed as Studio Roqovan. There, in 2016, he developed a new game, World War Toons, a first-person multiplayer shooter game compatible with 3D VR (Virtual Reality) and PSVR.

While working for Infinity Ward (the original COD developers) from 2004 to 2014, Taehoon as a senior and lead artist designed over 50 vehicles and 100 weapons used in Call of duty’s different versions including Call of Duty 2, Call of Duty 4: Modern Warfare, Call of Duty: Modern Warfare 2, Call of Duty: Modern Warfare 3, and Call Of Duty Ghost.

In 2007, he won the global game art competition for the game Dominance War, and he served as a judge in various gaming competitions.

Early life 
Oh's early education took place in South Korea. His gaming interest was developed when his father bought him an Apple II personal computer.

Awards 
World Champion of global games art competition held in 2007 for the game Dominance war.

References

External links 
Taehoon Oh webpage
KBS Interview Taehoon Oh
Call of Duty official webpage

Living people
Game artists
American game designers
Fantasy artists
South Korean emigrants to the United States
Video game artists
Video game developers
Year of birth missing (living people)